The fold-and-cut theorem states that any shape with straight sides can be cut from a single (idealized) sheet of paper by folding it flat and making a single straight complete cut. Such shapes include polygons, which may be concave, shapes with holes, and collections of such shapes (i.e. the regions need not be connected).

The corresponding problem that the theorem solves is known as the fold-and-cut problem, which asks what shapes can be obtained by the so-called fold-and-cut method. A particular instance of the problem, which asks how a particular shape can be obtained by the fold-and-cut method, is known as a fold-and-cut problem.

History 
The earliest known description of a fold-and-cut problem appears in Wakoku Chiyekurabe (Mathematical Contests), a book that was published in 1721 by Kan Chu Sen in Japan.

An 1873 article in Harper's New Monthly Magazine describes how Betsy Ross may have proposed that stars on the American flag have five points, because such a shape can easily be obtained by the fold-and-cut method.

In the 20th century, several magicians published books containing examples of fold-and-cut problems, including Will Blyth, Harry Houdini, and Gerald Loe (1955).

Inspired by Loe, Martin Gardner wrote about the fold-and-cut problems in Scientific American in 1960. Examples mentioned by Gardner include separating the red squares from the black squares of a checkerboard with one cut, and "an old paper-cutting stunt, of unknown origin" in which one cut splits a piece of paper into both a Latin cross and a set of smaller pieces that can be rearranged to spell the word "hell". Foreshadowing work on the general fold-and-cut theorem, he writes that "more complicated designs present formidable problems".

The first proof of the fold-and-cut theorem, solving the problem, was published in 1999 by Erik Demaine, Martin Demaine, and Anna Lubiw.

Solutions 
There are two general methods known for solving instances of the fold-and-cut problem, based on straight skeletons and on circle packing respectively.

References

External links 
 JOrigami, an open source java implementation of the solution of fold and cut problem.
 Fold and Cut Theorem (YouTube), a Numberphile video covering the theorem.

Paper folding
Theorems in geometry